The second season of Dance Moms, an American dance reality television created by Collins Avenue Productions, began airing on January 10, 2012 on Lifetime's television network. The season concluded on September 25, 2012. A total of 28 official episodes and 2 special episodes (Abby's Most OMG Moments, Abby's Dance-A-Thon) aired this season.

Overview
The second season continues after the release of Chloe's music video. The dancers of the Abby Lee Dance Company, and their mothers return for another season of dance competitions. In this season, new dance moms and dancers are introduced into both the Abby Lee Dance Company and Candy Apples Dance Center.

Cast
The second season featured thirteen star billing cast members with various other dancers and moms appearing throughout the season.

Dancers
 Maddie Ziegler
 Mackenzie Ziegler
 Chloe Lukasiak
 Nia Frazier
 Paige Hyland
 Brooke Hyland
 Kendall Vertes

Moms
 Melissa Gisoni 
 Christi Lukasiak
 Holly Hatcher-Frazier
 Kelly Hyland
 Jill Vertes

Guest dancers
 Payton Ackerman 
 Nicaya Wiley
 Nick Dobbs
 Auriel Welty
 Katherine Narasimhan
 Nina Linhart
 Vivi-Anne Stein (Candy Apples Team)
 Justice McCort (Candy Apples Team)
 Taylor O'Lear (Candy Apples Team)
 Erika Schrade (Candy Apples Team)
 Sarah Parish (Candy Apples Team)
 Kerisa McCullough (Candy Apples Team)

Guest moms
 Cathy Nesbitt-Stein (Candy Apples team)
 Leslie Ackerman
 Kaya Wiley

Cast duration

Notes

 Key:  = featured in this episode
 Key:  = not featured in this episode
 Key:  = joins the Abby Lee Dance Company
 Key:  = leaves the Abby Lee Dance Company
 Key:  = returns to the Abby Lee Dance Company
 Key:  = leaves the Candy Apples

Episodes

References

General references 
 
 
 

2012 American television seasons